Sinŭiju Special Administrative Region is a special administrative region (SAR) of North Korea proclaimed in 2002 (but has yet to be put into de facto operation), on the border with China. It was established in September 2002 in an area including parts of Sinŭiju and the surrounding area, in an attempt to introduce market economics, and is directly governed as in the case of "Directly Governed Cities". The special administrative region was modelled after China's Special Administrative Regions (SARs), Hong Kong and Macau, and, like them, has a "Basic Law" (기본법; Kibonpŏp).

Chinese-Dutch businessman Yang Bin was appointed to be the first governor by the SPA Presidium in 2002. Before he formally assumed his post, he was arrested by Chinese authorities and sentenced to 18 years in prison for tax evasion and other economic crimes. While the North Korean authorities soon announced that the development of the Sinŭiju SAR would continue and the SAR was put under the administration of its Commission of Foreign Economic Cooperation Promotion, the plans for the SAR seem to have been abandoned. As of April 2008, the SAR reforms still have not been put into effect, and it is widely believed that North Korea has abandoned the project after the governor's arrest. Merchant Julie Sa (沙日香) was appointed governor in 2004. However, this SAR was abolished in 2004.

Between 2013 and 2018, a smaller Sinuiju International Economic Zone was developed, backed by the state-owned Sinuiju Zone Development Corporation. It hopes to develop high value projects such as software development, computer manufacturing and trade-related services.

Area included in the Special Administrative Region
The order below follows the order given in the original decree (in Korean)  .

Sinŭiju city (신의주시; 新義州市)
 Kwanmun-dong (관문동; 關門洞)
 Ponbu-dong (본부동; 本部洞)
 Sinwon-dong (신원동; 新元洞)
 Yŏkchŏn-dong (역전동; 驛前洞)
 Ch'ŏngsong-dong (청송동; 青松洞)
 Kŭnhwa-dong (근화동; 芹花洞)
 Paeksa-dong (백사동; 白沙洞)
 Paekun-dong (백운동; 白雲洞)
 Ch'aeha-dong (채하동; 彩霞洞)
 Oil-dong (오일동; 五一洞; aka "May 1-dong")
 Apkang-dong (압강동; 鴨江洞)
 Namsang-dong (남상동; 南上洞)
 Namsŏ-dong (남서동; 南西洞)
 Namjung-dong (남중동; 南中洞)
 Namha-dong (남하동; 南下洞)
 Kaehyŏk-dong (개혁동; 改革洞)
 Haebang-dong (해방동; 解放洞)
 P'yŏnghwa-dong (평화동; 平和洞)
 Minp'o-dong (민포동; 敏浦洞)
 Namsong-dong (남송도; 南松洞)
 Sinnam-dong (신남동; 新南洞)
 Sinp'o-dong (신포동; 新浦洞)
 Sumun-dong (수문동; 水門洞)
 Nammin-dong (남민동; 南敏洞)
 Tongha-dong (동하동; 東下洞)
 Tongjung-dong (동중동; 東中洞)
 Tongsang-dong (동상동; 東上洞)
 Ch'insŏn 1-dong (친선일동; 親善1洞)
 Ch'insŏn 2-dong (친선이동; 親善2洞)
 Pangjik-dong (방직동; 紡織洞)
 Majŏn-dong (마전동; 麻田洞)
 Hadan-ri (하단리; 下端里)
 Sangdan-ri　(상단리; 上端里)
 Taji-ri　(다지리; 多智里)
 Sŏngsŏ-ri (성서리; 城西里)
 Part of Sŏnsang-dong (선상동; 仙上洞)
 Part of Yŏnha-dong　(연하동; 煙下洞)
 Part of Songhan-dong　(송한동; 送瀚洞)
 Part of Ryusang 1-dong　(류상일동; 柳上1洞)
 Part of Ryŏnsang 1-dong (련상일동; 蓮上1洞)
 Part of Paekt'u-dong (백투동; 白土洞)
 Part of T'osŏng-ri (토성리; 土城里)
 Part of Ryuch'o-ri (류초리; 柳草里)

Ŭiju county (의주군; 義州郡)
 Sŏho-ri (서호리; 西湖里)
 Part of Hongnam-ri (홍남리; 弘南里)
 Part of Taesan-ri (대산리; 臺山里)

Yŏmju county (염주군; 鹽州郡)
 Tasa-rodongjagu (다사로동자구; 多獅勞動者區; aka "Tasa workers' district")
 Part of Sŏkam-ri (석암리; 石岩里)

Ch'ŏlsan county (철산군; 鐵山郡)
 Part of Rihwa-ri (리화리; 梨花里)
 Part of Kŭmsan-ri (금산리; 錦山里)

Due to the areas included in the Special Administrative Region, it is not one single contiguous region, as to get from Sinŭiju city to Yŏmju county, one must pass through another county outside the region first.

Transportation

The SAR is served by rail at the Sinuiju Cheongnyeon Station. This station is a terminus station for trains from Pyongyang, capital of North Korea. Rail traffic from the station continues across the Sino–Korean Friendship Bridge over to China over the Yalu River. Public transport consists of trolleybuses.

Economy

A few factories and shipyard exist in Sinuiju, some producing consumer products for local use.

See also
Rason Special Economic Zone
Special economic zones of China

References

External links
Basic Law of Sinuiju Special Administrative Region (cache)

Sinuiju
Directly Governed Cities and Special Administrative Regions of North Korea
2002 establishments in North Korea